During the 1983–84 season, Newcastle United participated in the Football League Second Division. They finished 3rd and were promoted automatically to the First Division.

Former England captain Kevin Keegan was the leading scorer with 27 league goals, 28 in all competitions. He retired as a player following the final match of the season.

Squad
Substitute appearances indicated in brackets

League table

Results

Second Division

Milk Cup

FA Cup

References

Bibliography
 

Newcastle United F.C. seasons
Newcastle United